Lardgaram-e Pain (also Romanized as Lardgaram-e Pā’īn) is a village in Tarom Rural District, in the Central District of Hajjiabad County, Hormozgan Province, Iran. At the 2006 census, its population was 42, in 11 families.

References 

Populated places in Hajjiabad County